Ian Pretyman Stevenson (October 31, 1918 – February 8, 2007) was a Canadian-born American psychiatrist, the founder and director of the Division of Perceptual Studies at the University of Virginia School of Medicine.

He was a professor at the University of Virginia School of Medicine for fifty years. He was chair of their department of psychiatry from 1957 to 1967, Carlson Professor of Psychiatry from 1967 to 2001, and Research Professor of Psychiatry from 2002 until his death in 2007.

As founder and director of the University of Virginia School of Medicine's Division of Perceptual Studies (originally named "Division of Personality Studies"), which investigates the paranormal, Stevenson became known for his research into cases he considered suggestive of reincarnation – the idea that emotions, memories, and even physical bodily features can be passed on from one incarnation to another. In the course of his forty years doing international fieldwork, he researched three thousand cases of children who claimed to remember past lives. His position was that certain phobias, philias, unusual abilities and illnesses could not be fully explained by genetics or the environment. He believed that, in addition to genetics and the environment, reincarnation might possibly provide a third, contributing factor.

Stevenson helped to found the Society for Scientific Exploration in 1982, and was the author of around three hundred papers and fourteen books on reincarnation, including Twenty Cases Suggestive of Reincarnation (1966), Cases of the Reincarnation Type (four volumes, 1975-1983) and European Cases of the Reincarnation Type (2003). His 1997 work Reincarnation and Biology: A Contribution to the Etiology of Birthmarks and Birth Defects reported two hundred cases in which birthmarks and birth defects seemed to correspond in some way to a wound on the deceased person whose life the child recalled. He wrote a shorter version of the same research for the general reader, Where Reincarnation and Biology Intersect (1997).

Reaction to his work was mixed. In an obituary for Stevenson in The New York Times, Margalit Fox wrote that Stevenson's supporters saw him as a misunderstood genius, that his detractors regarded him as earnest but gullible, but that most scientists had simply ignored his research. His life and work became the subject of the supportive books Old Souls: The Scientific Search for Proof of Past Lives (1999) by Tom Shroder (a Washington Post journalist), Life Before Life (2005) by Jim B. Tucker (a psychiatrist and colleague at the University of Virginia who now heads the division Stevenson founded), and Science, the Self, and Survival after Death (2012), by Emily Williams Kelly. Critics, particularly the philosophers C.T.K. Chari (1909–1993) and Paul Edwards (1923–2004), raised a number of issues, including instances where the children or parents interviewed by Stevenson had deceived him, instances of Stevenson asking leading questions in his interviews, and problems with working through translators who credulously believed what the interviewees were saying at face value. Stevenson's critics contend that ultimately his conclusions are undermined by confirmation bias, where cases not supportive of his hypothesis were not presented as counting against it, and motivated reasoning since Stevenson had always maintained a personal belief in reincarnation as a fact of reality rather than also considering the possibility that it may not happen at all.

Background

Personal life and education
Ian Stevenson was born in Montreal and raised in Ottawa, one of three children. His father, John Stevenson, was a Scottish lawyer who was working in Ottawa as the Canadian correspondent for The Times of London or The New York Times. His mother, Ruth, had an interest in theosophy and an extensive library on the subject, to which Stevenson attributed his own early interest in the paranormal. As a child he was often bedridden with bronchitis, a condition that continued into adulthood and engendered in him a lifelong love of books. According to Emily Williams Kelly, a colleague of his at the University of Virginia, he maintained a list of the books he had read, which numbered 3,535 between 1935 and 2003.

He studied medicine at St. Andrews University in Scotland from 1937 to 1939, but had to complete his studies in Canada because of the outbreak of the Second World War. He graduated from McGill University with a B.S.c. in 1942 and an M.D. in 1943. He was married to Octavia Reynolds from 1947 until her death in 1983. In 1985, he married Dr. Margaret Pertzoff (1926–2009), professor of history at Randolph-Macon Woman's College. She did not share his views on the paranormal, but tolerated them with what Stevenson called "benevolent silences."

Early career
After graduating, Stevenson conducted research in biochemistry. His first residency was at the Royal Victoria Hospital in Montreal (1944–1945), but his lung condition continued to bother him, and one of his professors at McGill advised him to move to Arizona for his health. He took up a residency at St. Joseph's Hospital in Phoenix, Arizona (1945–1946). After that, he held a fellowship in internal medicine at the Alton Ochsner Medical Foundation in New Orleans, became a Denis Fellow in Biochemistry at Tulane University School of Medicine (1946–1947), and a Commonwealth Fund Fellow in Medicine at Cornell University Medical College and New York Hospital (1947–1949). He became a U.S. citizen in 1949.

Emily Williams Kelly writes that Stevenson became dissatisfied with the reductionism he encountered in biochemistry, and wanted to study the whole person. He became interested in psychosomatic medicine, psychiatry and psychoanalysis, and in the late 1940s, worked at New York Hospital exploring psychosomatic illness and the effects of stress, and in particular why one person's response to stress might be asthma and another's high blood pressure.

He taught at Louisiana State University School of Medicine from 1949 to 1957 as assistant, then associate, professor of psychiatry. 

In the 1950s, he met Aldous Huxley (1894–1963), known for his advocacy of psychedelic drugs, and studied the effects of L.S.D. and mescaline, one of the first academics to do so. Ian Stevenson, in his course of studies, tried and studied L.S.D. himself, describing three days of "perfect serenity." He wrote that at the time he felt he could "never be angry again," but added, "As it happens that didn't work out, but the memory of it persisted as something to hope for."

From 1951, he studied psychoanalysis at the New Orleans Psychoanalytic Institute and the Washington Psychoanalytic Institute, graduating from the latter in 1958, a year after being appointed head of the department of psychiatry at the University of Virginia. He argued against the orthodoxy within psychiatry and psychoanalysis at the time that the personality is more plastic in the early years; his paper on the subject, "Is the human personality more plastic in infancy and childhood?" (American Journal of Psychiatry, 1957), was not received well by his colleagues. He wrote that their response prepared him for the rejection he experienced over his work on the paranormal.

Reincarnation research

Early interest

Stevenson described as the leitmotif of his career his interest in why one person would develop one disease, and another something different. He came to believe that neither environment nor heredity could account for certain fears, illnesses and special abilities, and that some form of personality or memory transfer might provide a third type of explanation. He acknowledged, however, the absence of evidence of a physical process by which a personality could survive death and transfer to another body, and he was careful not to commit himself fully to the position that reincarnation occurs. He argued only that his case studies could not, in his view, be explained by environment or heredity, and that "reincarnation is the best – even though not the only – explanation for the stronger cases we have investigated." He said in 1974, looking back on his work:[W]hat I do believe is that, of the cases we now know, reincarnation--at least for some--is the best explanation that we have been able to come up with. There is an impressive body of evidence and it is getting stronger all the time. I think a rational person, if he wants, can believe in reincarnation on the basis of evidence.In 1958 and 1959, Stevenson contributed several articles and book reviews to Harper's about parapsychology, including psychosomatic illness and extrasensory perception, and in 1958, he submitted the winning entry to a competition organized by the American Society for Psychical Research, in honor of the philosopher William James (1842–1910). The prize was for the best essay on "paranormal mental phenomena and their relationship to the problem of survival of the human personality after bodily death." Stevenson's essay, "The Evidence for Survival from Claimed Memories of Former Incarnations" (1960), reviewed forty-four published cases of people, mostly children, who claimed to remember past lives. It caught the attention of Eileen J. Garrett (1893–1970), the founder of the Parapsychology Foundation, who gave Stevenson a grant to travel to India to interview a child who was claiming to have past-life memories. According to Jim Tucker, Stevenson found twenty-five other cases in just four weeks in India and was able to publish his first book on the subject in 1966, Twenty Cases Suggestive of Reincarnation.

Chester Carlson (1906–1968), the inventor of xerography, offered further financial help. Jim Tucker writes that this allowed Stevenson to step down as chair of the psychiatry department and set up a separate division within the department, which he called the Division of Personality Studies, later renamed the Division of Perceptual Studies.

When Carlson died in 1968, he left $1,000,000 to the University of Virginia to continue Stevenson's work. The bequest caused controversy within the university because of the nature of the research, but the donation was accepted, and Stevenson became the first Carlson Professor of Psychiatry.

Case studies

Overview

The bequest from Chester Carlson allowed Stevenson to travel extensively, sometimes as much as 55,000 miles a year, collecting around three thousand case studies based on interviews with children from Africa to Alaska.

In one case of claimed reincarnation, as Stevenson recounted it, a newborn girl in Sri Lanka screamed whenever she was carried near a bus or a bath. When she was old enough to talk, he said, she recounted a previous life as a girl of 8 or 9 who drowned after a bus knocked her into a flooded rice paddy; later investigation found the family of just such a dead girl living four or five kilometers away. The two families, Stevenson said, were believed to have had no contact.

According to journalist Tom Shroder, "In interviewing witnesses and reviewing documents, Stevenson searched for alternate ways to account for the testimony: that the child came upon the information in some normal way, that the witnesses were engaged in fraud or self-delusion, that the correlations were the result of coincidence or misunderstanding. But in scores of cases, Stevenson concluded that no normal explanation sufficed."

In some cases, a child in a "past life" case may have birthmarks or birth defects that in some way correspond to physical features of the "previous person" whose life the child seems to remember. Stevenson's Reincarnation and Biology: A Contribution to the Etiology of Birthmarks and Birth Defects (1997) examined two hundred cases of birth defects or birthmarks on children claiming past-life memories. These included children with malformed or missing fingers who said they recalled the lives of people who had lost fingers; a boy with birthmarks resembling entrance and exit wounds who said he recalled the life of someone who had been shot; and a child with a scar around her skull three centimetres wide who said she recalled the life of a man who had had skull surgery. In many of the cases, in Stevenson's view, the witness testimony or autopsy reports appeared to support the existence of the injuries on the deceased's body.

Reception

Criticism
The Journal of the American Medical Association referred to Stevenson's Cases of the Reincarnation Type (1975) as a "painstaking and unemotional" collection of cases that were "difficult to explain on any assumption other than reincarnation." In September 1977, the Journal of Nervous and Mental Disease devoted most of one issue to Stevenson's research. Writing in the journal, the psychiatrist Harold Lief described Stevenson as a methodical investigator and added, "Either he is making a colossal mistake, or he will be known (I have said as much to him) as 'the Galileo of the 20th century'." The issue proved popular: the journal's editor, the psychiatrist Eugene Brody, said he had received 300–400 requests for reprints.

Despite this early interest, most scientists ignored Stevenson's work. According to his New York Times obituary, his detractors saw him as "earnest, dogged but ultimately misguided, led astray by gullibility, wishful thinking and a tendency to see science where others saw superstition." Critics suggested that the children or their parents had deceived him, that he was too willing to believe them, and that he had asked them leading questions. Robert Todd Carroll wrote in his Skeptic's Dictionary that Stevenson's results were subject to confirmation bias, in that cases not supportive of the hypothesis were not presented as counting against it. Leonard Angel, a philosopher of religion, told The New York Times that Stevenson did not follow proper standards. "[B]ut you do have to look carefully to see it; that's why he's been very persuasive to many people."

In an article in Skeptical Inquirer Angel examined Stevenson’s Twenty Cases Suggestive of Reincarnation (1974) and concluded that the research was so poorly conducted as to cast doubt on all Stevenson's work. He says that Stevenson failed to clearly and concisely document the claims made before attempting to verify them. Among a number of other faults, Angel says, Stevenson asked leading questions and did not properly tabulate or account for all erroneous statements. Angel writes:

Skeptics have written that Stevenson's evidence was anecdotal and by applying Occam's razor there are prosaic explanations for the cases without invoking the paranormal. Science writer Terence Hines has written:

Robert Baker wrote that many of the alleged past-life experiences investigated by Stevenson and other parapsychologists can be explained in terms of known psychological factors. Baker attributed the recalling of past lives to a mixture of cryptomnesia and confabulation.

British author and religious studies scholar, Ian Wilson, argued that a large number of Stevenson's cases consisted of poor children remembering wealthy lives or belonging to a higher caste. He speculated that such cases may represent a scheme to obtain money from the family of the alleged former incarnation.

The philosopher C.T.K. Chari of Madras Christian College in Chennai, a specialist in parapsychology, argued that Stevenson was naive and that the case studies were undermined by his lack of local knowledge. Chari wrote that many of the cases had come from societies, such as that of India, where people believed in reincarnation, and that the stories were simply cultural artifacts; he argued that, for children in many Asian countries, the recall of a past life is the equivalent of an imaginary playmate. The philosopher Keith Augustine made a similar argument.

Responding to this cultural argument, Stevenson said that it was precisely those societies that listened to children's claims about past lives, which in Europe or North America would normally be dismissed without investigation. To address the cultural concern, he wrote European Cases of the Reincarnation Type (2003), which presented forty cases he had examined in Europe. Moreover, Joseph Prabhu, professor emeritus of philosophy and religion at California State University, wrote that it is not true "that these cases are mainly to be found in cultures, where the belief in reincarnation is prevalent. In July 1974 Stevenson's colleague at the University of Virginia, J. G. Pratt, carried out a census of Stevenson's cases and found that of the 1339 cases then in Stevenson's file, 'the United States has the most, with 324 cases (not counting American Indian and Eskimo) and the next five countries in descending order are Burma (139 cases), India (135), Turkey (114), and Great Britain (111).'"

The philosopher Paul Edwards, editor-in-chief of Macmillan's Encyclopedia of Philosophy, became Stevenson's chief critic. From 1986 onwards, he devoted several articles to Stevenson's work, and discussed Stevenson in his Reincarnation: A Critical Examination (1996). He argued that Stevenson's views were "absurd nonsense" and that when examined in detail his case studies had "big holes" and "do not even begin to add up to a significant counterweight to the initial presumption against reincarnation." Stevenson, Edwards wrote, "evidently lives in a cloud-cuckoo-land."

Champe Ransom, whom Stevenson hired as an assistant in the 1970s, wrote an unpublished report about Stevenson's work, which Edwards cites in his Immortality (1992) and Reincarnation (1996). According to Ransom, Edwards wrote, Stevenson asked the children leading questions, filled in gaps in the narrative, did not spend enough time interviewing them, and left too long a period between the claimed recall and the interview; it was often years after the first mention of a recall that Stevenson learned about it. In only eleven of the 1,111 cases Ransom looked at had there been no contact between the families of the deceased and of the child before the interview; in addition, according to Ransom, seven of those eleven cases were seriously flawed. He also wrote that there were problems with the way Stevenson presented the cases, in that he would report his witnesses' conclusions, rather than the data upon which the conclusions rested. Weaknesses in cases would be reported in a separate part of his books, rather than during the discussion of the cases themselves. Ransom concluded that it all amounted to anecdotal evidence of the weakest kind.

In Death and Personal Survival (1992), Robert Almeder, professor emeritus of philosophy at Georgia State University, holds that Ransom was false in stating that there were only 11 cases with no prior contact between the two families concerned.. According to Almeder there were 23 such cases.

Edwards cited the case of Corliss Chotkin, Jr.,  in Angoon, Alaska, described in Stevenson's Twenty Cases Suggestive of Reincarnation (1966), as an example that relied entirely on the word of one woman, the niece of Victor Vincent, a fisherman. (Victor Vincent was the person whose life Corliss Chotkin, Jr., seemed to remember.) Edwards wrote that, among the many weaknesses in the case, the family were religious believers in reincarnation, Chotkin had birthmarks that were said to have resembled scars that Vincent had but Stevenson had not seen Vincent's scars, and all the significant details relied on the niece. Edwards said that Stevenson offered no information about her, except that several people told him she had a tendency, as Stevenson put it, to embellish or invent stories. Edwards wrote that similar weaknesses could be found in all Stevenson's case studies. In Stevenson's defense, Robert Almeder wrote in 1997 that the Chotkin case was one of Stevenson's weaker ones.

Edwards charged that Stevenson referred to himself as a scientist but did not act like one. According to Edwards, he failed to respond to, or even mention, significant objections; the large bibliography in Stevenson's Children Who Remember Previous Lives (1987) does not include one paper or book from his opponents.

 Stevenson wrote an introduction to a book, Second Time Round (1975), in which Edward Ryall, an Englishman, told of what he believed to be his memories of a past life as John Fletcher, a man who was born in 1645 in Taunton, England, and died forty years later near his home in Westonzoyland, Somerset. Stevenson investigated the case and discovered that some of the historical features from Ryall's book were accurate. Stevenson wrote, "I think it most probable that he has memories of a real previous life and that he is indeed John Fletcher reborn, as he believes himself to be". In 1976, however, John Taylor discovered that none of the available church records at the Westonzoyland church from 1645 to 1685 had entries for births, marriages, or deaths for the name Fletcher. Since no trace of the name could be found, he concluded that no man called John Fletcher actually existed and that the supposed memories were a fantasy Ryall had developed over the years. Stevenson later altered his opinion about the case. In his book European Cases of the Reincarnation Type, he wrote, "I can no longer believe that all of Edward Ryall's apparent memories derive from a previous life, because some of his details are clearly wrong," but he still suggested that Ryall acquired some information about 17th-century Somerset by paranormal means.

Concessions from critics
Ian Wilson, one of Stevenson’s critics, acknowledged that Stevenson had brought “a new professionalism to a hitherto crank-prone field.” Paul Edwards wrote that Stevenson “has written more fully and more intelligibly in defense of reincarnation than anybody else.” Though faulting Stevenson’s judgment, Edwards wrote: “I have the highest regard for his honesty. All of his case reports contain items that can be made the basis of criticism. Stevenson could easily have suppressed this information. The fact that he did not speaks well for his integrity.”

Carl Sagan referred to what were apparently Stevenson's investigations in his book The Demon-Haunted World as an example of carefully collected empirical data, and though he rejected reincarnation as a parsimonious explanation for the stories, he wrote that the phenomenon of alleged past-life memories should be further researched. Sam Harris cited Stevenson's works in his book The End of Faith as part of a body of data that seems to attest to the reality of psychic phenomena, but that only relies on subjective personal experience.

Support
In support of Stevenson, Almeder argued in Death and Personal Survival that Edwards had begged the question by stating in advance that the idea of consciousness existing without the brain in the interval between lives was incredible, and that Edwards's "dogmatic materialism" had forced him to the view that Stevenson's case studies must be examples of fraud or delusional thinking. According to Almeder, the possibility of fraud was indeed investigated in the cases Edwards mentioned.

In an article published on the website of Scientific American in 2013, in which Stevenson's work was reviewed favorably, Jesse Bering, a professor of science communication, wrote: "Towards the end of her own storied life, the physicist Doris Kuhlmann-Wilsdorf—whose groundbreaking theories on surface physics earned her the prestigious Heyn Medal from the German Society for Material Sciences, surmised that Stevenson’s work had established that 'the statistical probability that reincarnation does in fact occur is so overwhelming … that cumulatively the evidence is not inferior to that for most if not all branches of science.' "

Xenoglossy 
Although Stevenson mainly focused on cases of children who seemed to remember past lives, he also studied two cases in which adults under hypnosis seemed to remember a past life and show rudimentary use of a language they had not learned in the present life. Stevenson called this phenomenon "xenoglossy." The linguist Sarah Thomason, critiquing these cases, wrote that Stevenson is "unsophisticated about language" and that the cases are unconvincing. Thomason concluded, "the linguistic evidence is too weak to provide support for the claims of xenoglossy." William J. Samarin, a linguist from the University of Toronto, wrote that Stevenson corresponded with linguists in a selective and unprofessional manner. He said that Stevenson corresponded with one linguist in a period of six years "without raising any discussion about the kinds of thing that linguists would need to know." Another linguist, William Frawley, wrote, "Stevenson does not consider enough linguistic evidence in these cases to warrant his metaphysics."

Retirement

Stevenson stepped down as director of the Division of Perceptual Studies in 2002, although he continued to work as Research Professor of Psychiatry. Bruce Greyson, editor of the Journal of Near-Death Studies, became director of the division. Jim Tucker, the department's associate professor of psychiatry and neurobehavioral sciences, continued Stevenson's research with children, examined in Tucker's book, Life Before Life: A Scientific Investigation of Children's Memories of Previous Lives (2005).

Death and experiment
Stevenson died of pneumonia on February 8, 2007, at his home in Charlottesville, Virginia. In his will he endowed the Stevenson Chair in Philosophy and History of Science including Medicine, at McGill University Department of Social Studies of Medicine.

As one experiment to test for personal survival of bodily death, in the 1960s Stevenson set a combination lock using a secret word or phrase and placed it in a filing cabinet in the department, telling his colleagues he would try to pass the code to them after his death. Emily Williams Kelly told The New York Times: "Presumably, if someone had a vivid dream about him, in which there seemed to be a word or a phrase that kept being repeated—I don't quite know how it would work—if it seemed promising enough, we would try to open it using the combination suggested."

Works
Books

(1960). Medical History-Taking. Paul B. Hoeber.
(1966). Twenty Cases Suggestive of Reincarnation. University of Virginia Press.
(1969). The Psychiatric Examination. Little, Brown.
(1970). Telepathic Impressions: A Review and Report of 35 New Cases. University Press of Virginia.
(1971). The Diagnostic Interview (2nd revised edition of Medical History-Taking). Harper & Row.
(1974). Twenty Cases Suggestive of Reincarnation (second revised and enlarged edition). University of Virginia Press.
(1974). Xenoglossy: A Review and Report of A Case. University of Virginia Press.
(1975). Cases of the Reincarnation Type, Vol. I: Ten Cases in India. University of Virginia Press.
(1978). Cases of the Reincarnation Type, Vol. II: Ten Cases in Sri Lanka. University of Virginia Press.
(1980). Cases of the Reincarnation Type, Vol. III: Twelve Cases in Lebanon and Turkey. University of Virginia Press.
(1983). Cases of the Reincarnation Type, Vol. IV: Twelve Cases in Thailand and Burma. University of Virginia Press.
(1984). Unlearned Language: New Studies in Xenoglossy. University of Virginia Press.
(1987). Children Who Remember Previous Lives: A Question of Reincarnation. University of Virginia Press.
(1997). Reincarnation and Biology: A Contribution to the Etiology of Birthmarks and Birth Defects. Volume 1: Birthmarks. Praeger Publishers.
(1997). Reincarnation and Biology: A Contribution to the Etiology of Birthmarks and Birth Defects. Volume 2: Birth Defects and Other Anomalies. Praeger Publishers.
(1997). Where Reincarnation and Biology Intersect. Praeger Publishers (a short, non-technical version of Reincarnation and Biology).
(2000). Children Who Remember Previous Lives: A Question of Reincarnation (revised edition). McFarland Publishing.
(2003). European Cases of the Reincarnation Type. McFarland & Company.
(2019). Handbook of Psychiatry volume Five (Co-written with Javad Nurbakhsh and Hamideh Jahangiri). LAP LAMBERT Academic Publishing.
(2020). Psychological Treatment Techniques For Social Anxiety Disorder (Co-written with Aliakbar Shoarinejad and Hamideh Jahangiri). Scholars' Press.

Selected articles

(1949). "Why medicine is not a science", Harper's, April.
(1952). "Illness from the inside", Harper's, March.
(1952). "Why people change", Harper's, December.
(1954). "Psychosomatic medicine, Part I", Harper's, July.
(1954). "Psychosomatic medicine, Part II", Harper's, August.
(1957). "Tranquilizers and the mind", Harper's, July.
(1957). "Schizophrenia", Harper's, August.
(1957). "Is the human personality more plastic in infancy and childhood?", American Journal of Psychiatry, 114(2), pp. 152–161.
(1958). "Scientists with half-closed minds" Harper's, November.
(1959). "A Proposal for Studying Rapport which Increases Extrasensory Perception," Journal of the American Society for Psychical Research, 53, pp. 66–68.
(1959). "The Uncomfortable Facts about Extrasensory Perception", Harper's, July.
(1960). "The Evidence for Survival from Claimed Memories of Former Incarnations," Journal of the American Society for Psychical Research, 54, pp. 51–71.
(1960). "The Evidence for Survival from Claimed Memories of Former Incarnations": Part II. Analysis of the Data and Suggestions for Further Investigations, Journal of the American Society for Psychical Research, 54, pp. 95–117.
(1961). "An Example Illustrating the Criteria and Characteristics of Precognitive Dreams," Journal of the American Society for Psychical Research, 55, pp. 98–103.
(1964). "The Blue Orchid of Table Mountain," Journal of the Society for Psychical Research, 42, pp. 401–409.
(1968). "The Combination Lock Test for Survival," Journal of the American Society for Psychical Research, 62, pp. 246–254.
(1970). "Characteristics of Cases of the Reincarnation Type in Turkey and their Comparison with Cases in Two other Cultures," International Journal of Comparative Sociology, 11, pp. 1–17.
(1970). "A Communicator Unknown to Medium and Sitters," Journal of the American Society for Psychical Research, 64, pp. 53–65.
(1970). "Precognition of Disasters," Journal of the American Society for Psychical Research, 64, pp. 187–210.
(1971). "The Substantiability of Spontaneous cases," Proceedings of the Parapsychological Association, No. 5, pp. 91–128.
(1972). "Are Poltergeists Living or Are They Dead?," Journal of the American Society for Psychical Research, 66, pp. 233–252.
(1977). 
(1983). 
(1986). 
(1993). 
with Emily Williams Cook and Bruce Greyson (1998). 
(1999). 
(2000). 
(2000). 
(2001). 
with Satwant K. Pasricha; Jürgen Keil; and Jim B. Tucker (2005). 
(2005). Foreword and afterword in Mary Rose Barrington and Zofia Weaver. A World in a Grain of Sand: The Clairvoyance of Stefan Ossowiecki. McFarland Press.

An extended list of Stevenson's works is online here: http://www.pflyceum.org/167.html

 See also 

References

Bibliography
Almeder, Robert (1992). Death and Personal Survival: The Evidence for Life After Death. Rowman and Littlefield.

 Bache, Christopher (2000). Dark Night, Early Dawn: Steps to a Deep Ecology of Mind. State University of New York Press.
Brody, Eugene B. (1977). "Research in Reincarnation and Editorial Responsibility: An Editorial", The Journal of Nervous and Mental Disease, 165(3), September.
Cadoret, Remi J. (2005). "Review of European Cases of the Reincarnation Type", American Journal of Psychiatry, 162(4), April.
Carroll, Robert T. (July 7, 2009). "Ian Stevenson (1918-2007)", The Skeptic's Dictionary.The Daily Telegraph (February 12, 2007).  (obituary).
Debus, Allen G. (1968). World Who's Who in Science. Marquis-Who's Who.
Edwards, Paul (1992). "Introduction" and "The Dependence of Consciousness on the Brain," in Paul Edwards (ed.). Immortality. Prometheus Books.
Edwards, Paul (1996). Reincarnation: A Critical Examination. Prometheus Books.
Fox, Margalit (February 18, 2007). "Ian Stevenson Dies at 88; Studied Claims of Past Lives", The New York Times.
Hines Terence (2003). Pseudoscience and the Paranormal. Prometheus Books. 
Hopkins Tanne, Janice (April 2, 2007). "Obituaries: Ian Pretyman Stevenson", British Medical Journal.
Kelly, Emily Williams (2007). "Ian P. Stevenson" , University of Virginia School of Medicine, February (obituary).
Kelly, Edward F. and Kelly, Emily Williams (2007). Irreducible Mind: Toward a Psychology for the 21st Century. Rowman & Littlefield.
Lester, David (2005). Is There Life After Death? An Examination of the Empirical Evidence. McFarland. 
Lief, Harold (1977). "Commentary on Ian Stevenson’s 'The Evidence of Man’s Survival After Death'", The Journal of Nervous and Mental Disease, 165(3), September.
McClelland, Norman C. (2010). Encyclopedia of Reincarnation and Karma. McFarland.
Pandarakalam, James Paul (April 2, 2007). "Professor Ian Stevenson, an emperor in parapsychology", British Medical Journal (obituary).
Shroder, Tom (February 11, 2007). "Ian Stevenson; Sought To Document Memories Of Past Lives in Children", The Washington Post (obituary).

Stevenson, Ian (1966). Twenty Cases Suggestive of Reincarnation. University of Virginia Press.

Stevenson, Ian (1989)., The Flora Levy Lecture in the Humanities.
Stevenson, Ian (1992). "Birthmarks and Birth Defects Corresponding to Wounds on Deceased Persons", paper presented at the Eleventh Annual Meeting of the Society for Scientific Exploration, Princeton University, June 11–13.

Stevenson, Ian (2006)., Journal of Scientific Exploration, 20(1).

Tucker, Jim B. (2005). Life Before Life: A Scientific Investigation of Children's Memories of Previous Lives. St. Martin's Press.
University of Virginia (undated)., School of Medicine.
University of Virginia (undated)., Division of Perceptual Studies, School of Medicine.
University of Virginia (undated). "History and description" , Division of Perceptual Studies, School of Medicine.
Woodhouse, Mark (1996). Paradigm Wars: Worldviews for a New Age. Frog Books.

Further reading
Ian Stevenson/reincarnation
Almeder, Robert (2000). , interview with Robert Almeder, professor of philosophy at Georgia State University (video).
Moallem, Ehsan (2014). , presentation of Ian Stevenson's work by Ehsan Moallem (video)
Almeder, Robert (1988). "Response to 'Past Tongues Remembered'," Skeptical Inquirer, 12, Spring.
Almeder, Robert (1987). Beyond Death. Charles C. Thomas.
Alvarado, Carlos S. "Ian Stevenson, Selected Bibliography" , Parapsychological Association.

Edwards, Paul (1986). "The Case Against Reincarnation: Part 1," Free Inquiry, 6, Fall, pp. 24–34.
Edwards, Paul (1986/7). "The Case Against Reincarnation: Part 2," Free Inquiry, 7, Winter, pp. 38–43.
Edwards, Paul (1987a). "The Case Against Reincarnation: Part 3," Free Inquiry, 7, Spring, pp. 38–49.
Edwards, Paul (1987b). "The Case Against Reincarnation: Part 4," Free Inquiry, 7, Summer, pp. 46–53.
Griffin, David Ray (1997). Parapsychology, Philosophy, and Spirituality: A Postmodern Exploration. SUNY Press (particularly chapter 6, "Evidence from Cases of the Reincarnation Type").

Almeder, Robert (2001). "On reincarnation: A reply to Hales", Philosophia.
Hales, Steven (2001b). "Reincarnation redux," Philosophia, 28(1–4): 359–367.
Irwin, Harvey J. (2004). An Introduction to Parapsychology. McFarland.
Martin, Raymond (1994). "Survival of Bodily Death: A Question of Values", in John Donnelly (ed.) Language, Metaphysics, and Death. Fordham University Press.
Rockley, Richard (1 November 2002). "Book Review: Children who remember previous lives, A question of reincarnation, Ian Stevenson", Skeptic Report.
Spence, Lewis (2003). "Stevenson, Ian", Encyclopedia of Occultism and Parapsychology. Kessinger Publishing.

Wilson, Ian (1981). Mind Out of Time?: Reincarnation Claims Investigated. Orion Books Limited.

Consciousness
Almeder, Robert (2011). "The Major Objections from Reductive Materialism Against Belief in the Existence of Cartesian Mind-Body Dualism", in Alexander Moreira-Almeida and Franklin Santana Santos, Exploring Frontiers of the Mind-Brain Relationship, Springer, pp. 16–33

Levine, Joseph (2001). Purple Haze: The Puzzle of Consciousness. Oxford University Press.
Penrose, Roger (1994). Shadows of the Mind: A Search for the Missing Science of Consciousness. Oxford University Press.
Velman, Max and Schneider, Susan (2007). The Blackwell Companion to Consciousness. University of Oxford Press.
Zelazo, Philip David; Moscovitch, Morris; and Thompson, Evan (eds.) (2007). The Cambridge Handbook of Consciousness. University of Cambridge Press.

Miscellaneous
Almeder, Robert (1998). Harmless naturalism: The limits of science and the nature of philosophy. Open Court Publishers.

Schumacher, Bernard N. (2005). Death and Mortality in Contemporary Philosophy''. Cambridge University Press.

1918 births
2007 deaths
20th-century American essayists
20th-century American male writers
20th-century American physicians
20th-century Canadian essayists
20th-century Canadian male writers
20th-century Canadian physicians
21st-century American essayists
21st-century American male writers
21st-century American physicians
Academics from Montreal
Alumni of the University of St Andrews
American male essayists
American male non-fiction writers
American medical researchers
American people of Scottish descent
American psychiatrists
Canadian emigrants to the United States
Canadian male essayists
Canadian male non-fiction writers
Canadian medical researchers
Canadian people of Scottish descent
Canadian psychiatrists
Canadian consciousness researchers and theorists
Deaths from pneumonia in Virginia
Fringe science
McGill University Faculty of Medicine alumni
Naturalized citizens of the United States
Parapsychologists
Physicians from Montreal
Physicians from Virginia
Psychedelic drug researchers
Reincarnation researchers
University of Virginia School of Medicine faculty
Writers about religion and science